Max Long is the name of:

 Max Freedom Long (1890–1971), American teacher and philosopher
 Maxie Long (1878–1959), American athlete and Olympic medalist

In computer science, the term max long may also refer to the maximum value that can be represented by a long integer data type.